The Slovenian Naval Barracks is the sole barracks of the Slovenian Navy. It is situated in Ankaran, a settlement on the coast of the Adriatic Sea in southwestern Slovenia. The barracks were first used by the Slovenian Navy detachment in 1999. It is one of the smallest and newest barracks in Slovenia.

External links

Barracks
Barracks in Slovenia
Municipality of Ankaran
1999 establishments in Slovenia